James H. Jensen (August 16, 1864 – March 16, 1943) was a member of the Wisconsin State Assembly.)

James Jensen was born on a farm near Grantsburg, Wisconsin. He was one of eight children born to Norwegian immigrants. Jensen was a businessman engaged in mercantile, lumber and real estate. He was first elected as a member of the Wisconsin State Assembly during the 1917 session and was afterwards re-elected. Other public positions he held included County Clerk and Chairman of the County Board of Burnett County, Wisconsin and Village President (similar to Mayor) of Grantsburg, Wisconsin. He was a Republican.

References

Other sources
Smallwood, William Hillary ed. (1905) Commemorative Biographical Record of the Upper Lake Region (Chicago: J. H. Beers & Company)

External links
Find a Grave

People from Grantsburg, Wisconsin
Mayors of places in Wisconsin
County clerks in Wisconsin
American Lutherans
American people of Norwegian descent
1864 births
1943 deaths
Republican Party members of the Wisconsin State Assembly